These are the list of renamed places in the United States --- various political and physical entities in the U.S. that have had their names changed, though not by merger, split, or any other process which was not one-to-one.  It also generally does not include differences due to a change in status, for example, a "River Bluff Recreation  Area" the becomes "River Bluff State Parkway".

Alaska
Mount McKinley National Park was renamed Denali National Park and Preserve in 1980 (the eponymous mountain itself was renamed Denali by the state government in 1975, but was not officially renamed Denali by the federal government until 2015)
Barrow was renamed Utqiaġvik in 2016, after its original Iñupiaq name.
Black River was renamed Draanjik River after its original Gwich'in name in 2014. 
Chandalar River was renamed Ch'iidrinjik River and Teedrinjik River as replacements for the North and Middle forks of the river in 2015.
Sheldon Point was renamed Nunam Iqua in 1999, after its original Yup'ik name. 
Willoughby District in Juneau was renamed to Aakw Kwaan Village District in 2019.

California
Acalanes is now Lafayette
Agua Caliente is now Warner Springs
Alvarado is now Union City
Amador is now Dublin
Arroyo de las Campanas is now Bell Creek
Arroyo Salado is now Salt Creek
Bella Vista is now Bay Point
Botellas is now Jackson
Branciforte County is now Santa Cruz County
Buena Vista County is now Kern County
Cañada de la Molina Vallejo is now Niles Canyon
Cañada de San Diego is now Mission Valley
Cascada is now Big Creek
Cuesta de los Gatos is now Patchen Pass
Dos Pueblos is now Naples
El Alisal is now Pleasanton
El Toro is now Lake Forest
Río de los Reyes is now Kings River
Laguna Grande is now Lake Elsinore
La Mineta is now Mount Bullion
Leodocia is now Red Bluff
Maltermoro is now Sunnyside
Merienda is now Dresser
Mission San José is now Fremont
Monte Vista is now Montclair
Moro is now Taft
Nueva Almadén is now New Almaden
Oleta is now Fiddletown
Oneida is now Martell
Oro Groso is now Coarse Gold
Pino is now Loomis
Port Ballona is now Playa del Rey
Portezuela de Buenos Ayres is now Corral Hollow Pass
Punta Arena is now Point Arena
Rancho de la Nación is now National City
Monte Santa Isabel is now Mount Hamilton
Río de los Americanos is now American River
Río de San Felipe is now Kern River
Río de San Pedro is now Tule River
Río Estanislao is now Stanislaus River
Río Porciúncula is now Los Angeles River
San Gorgonio is now Beaumont
San Justo is now Hollister
San Luis Rey is now Oceanside
San Ysidro is now Gilroy
Santa Ynez is now Solvang
Sepúlveda is now North Hills
Todos Santos is now Concord
Valle de Mocho is now Blackbird Valley
Valle de San José is now Livermore Valley
Vallecitos is now Rainbow
Yerba Buena is now San Francisco

Connecticut
Chatham became East Hampton in 1915.
Dorchester became Windsor in 1637
Huntington became Shelton in 1919
New Roxbury became Woodstock in 1690
Newe Town became Hartford in 1637
Saybrook became Deep River in 1947
Watertown became Wethersfield in 1635
Westbury is now Watertown

Delaware
Willington was changed in 1739 to Wilmington in honor of Spencer Compton, Earl of Wilmington

Florida
Cape Canaveral was renamed Cape Kennedy between 1963 and 1973
Cowford (1763–1822) is now Jacksonville
Dade County (1836–1997) is now Miami-Dade County
Flagler was changed to Miami before becoming official
Ocean City (1913–1923) is now Flagler Beach (there is another Ocean City, Florida elsewhere)

Georgia
Big Shanty (to 1860s) is now Kennesaw
Cass County (to 1860s) is now Bartow County
Crossroads is now Vinings
Franklin is now West Point (there is now another Franklin nearby)
Hammond is now Sandy Springs
Harnageville (1832–1880) is now Tate
Jonesborough is now Jonesboro
Lovejoy's Station is now Lovejoy
Marble Works (to 1832) is now Tate
Marthasville (late 1840s) is now Atlanta
New Prospect Camp Ground is now Alpharetta
Northcutt Station (1840–1843) is now Acworth
Paces is now Vinings
Rough and Ready is now Mountain View
Ruff's Station is now Smyrna
Terminus (mid-1840s) was later Atlanta
Tunnelsville (1848–1856) is now Tunnel Hill
Varner's Station is now Smyrna

Illinois
Park Forest South is now University Park
East Chicago Heights is now Ford Heights
Westhaven is now Orland Hills

Indiana
Hudson in DeKalb County is now Sedan (there is another Hudson in neighboring Steuben County)
Iba was also a previous name for Sedan
Jervis or Jarvis in DeKalb County is now Butler
Kekionga, the capital of the Miami tribe, is now Fort Wayne.
Newport in Wayne County is now Fountain City  (there is another Newport in Vermillion County)
Vienna in DeKalb County is now Newville.

Kentucky
Limestone was named Maysville after John May, a surveyor, clerk and land owner in the area in 1787 when the town was formed. The post office opened as "Limestone" and kept that name from 1794 to 1799.

Massachusetts
Cold Spring (1731–1761) became Belchertown (1761–Present).
Gay Head (1870-1998) became Aquinnah (1998–Present) after residents voted to approve the name change in 1997.
Manchester (1645–1989) became Manchester-By-The-Sea (1989–Present).
 Trimountaine (1625-1630) became Boston (1630-Present).

Minnesota 

 Lake Calhoun is now Bde Maka Ska.

Mississippi
Gumpond (to 1860s) is now Tupelo

Nebraska
Lancaster (1856–1869) is now Lincoln in honor of Abraham Lincoln.

New Jersey 
New Orange is now Kenilworth
German Valley is now Long Valley
Vernon Valley is now Verona

New Mexico 
Hot Springs is now Truth or Consequences

New York 
Idlewild Airport is now John F. Kennedy International Airport
New Amsterdam (17th century) is now New York
Nieuw Amersfoort is now Flatlands, Brooklyn
Pigtown, Brooklyn is now Wingate, Brooklyn
North Tarrytown is now Sleepy Hollow

North Carolina 
Hamburgh (later Hamburg) is now Glenville
 The towns of Leaksville, Spray, and Draper were consolidated and became the city of Eden in 1967.

Ohio 
Losantiville (prior to 1790) is now Cincinnati
Port Columbus International Airport (prior to 2016) is now John Glenn Columbus International Airport

Pennsylvania 
Mauch Chunk (prior to 1953) is now Jim Thorpe
Hickory Township (prior to 1972) is now Hermitage

South Carolina 
Charles Town (colonial period) is now Charleston.

Tennessee 
 Coal Creek became Lake City in 1936, after the completion of Norris Dam, which created Norris Lake. Later, it was renamed to Rocky Top.

Texas 
 Waterloo was renamed Austin after Stephen F. Austin in 1839 when it was chosen to be the capital of the new Republic of Texas.

Utah 
 The territory that became Utah was known as Deseret when first settled by Latter-Day Saints in 1847
 Parley's Park City became shortened to Park City
 Fort Utah became Provo
 The area known as Provo Bench became Orem before the city's incorporation in 1919

Wyoming 
 The valley in which the town of Jackson is located was originally known as Jackson's Hole and is now Jackson Hole. (The town's name has never contained the word "Hole".)

References

 

Renamed
Renamed
United States
United States